Louise Adler  is an Australian publisher. She was CEO of Melbourne University Publishing (MUP) from 2003 until 2019, when she became editor-at-large at Hachette Australia. In March 2022 she took up a three-year appointment as director of Adelaide Writers' Week, starting with the 2023 edition of the event.

Early life and education
Louise Adler was born in Melbourne to Jacques and Ruth Adler, Jewish immigrants from Paris, France, who arrived in Australia in 1949. Jacques joined the French Resistance in World War II after his own father, Simon Adlersztejn, was rounded up and deported to Beaune-la-Rolande, eventually dying at Auschwitz. Ruth was taken to France as a seven-year-old by her parents fleeing from Nazi Germany, but her extended family were all murdered in the Holocaust. In Melbourne, Ruth worked as a schoolteacher, and Jacques was a research fellow in the history department of the University of Melbourne.

Adler attended Elwood Primary School, the Elsternwick campus of Methodist Ladies' College, and finally Mount Scopus Memorial College.

After matriculation she went first to study in Israel, before moving to the United Kingdom. She graduated with a Bachelor of Arts from University of Reading, and a Master of Arts and Master of Philosophy from Columbia University, studying under Edward Said.

Career
In 1980, after returning to Melbourne from New York City, Adler became a literature tutor at the University of Melbourne. From 1988 to 1989 she was editor of Australian Book Review,  and from 1989 to 1994 publishing director of Reed Books Australia. She then became arts and entertainment editor for The Age, where she ran into conflicts with some of her colleagues as well as theatre critic Len Radic, over a review she wrote. From 1996 she worked for ABC Radio, presenting Arts Today, before becoming the inaugural Deputy Director (Academic and Research)  at the Victorian College of the Arts in 1999.

From around 1999 she served as a council member of Monash University, and served as Deputy Chancellor from 2010 to 2013.

She became CEO of Melbourne University Publishing (MUP) in 2003, during which time it published the literary magazine Meanjin (which went online during this period). She resigned from MUP in January 2019, along with four board members, after the university had decided on a change of strategy, turning back to a more academic focus. Adler had broadened its focus to include books with greater commercial appeal, including books by public figures and present and former politicians, such as Gough Whitlam and Tony Abbott. The board members who resigned feared a loss of editorial independence under the new strategy.

Adler was appointed publisher-at-large for Hachette Australia in September 2019. 

She took over as director of Adelaide Writers' Week after the March 2022 edition, when she stepped down from Hachette and began to plan for the 2023 event. She is taking over the role from Jo Dyer for three years, directing the event until 2025. She has selected writers with the intention of exploring the meaning of truth, including JM Coetzee, playwright David Hare, and filmmaker Terence Davies.

At the Adelaide Writers' week in 2023, authors who had praised Russian President Vladimir Putin spoke, leading at least two Ukrainian authors to withdraw.  Consequently at least three large sponsors withdrew their support for the festival.

Board memberships and other roles
Adler has also served on several boards, including as a member of the Monash University council, director on the Melbourne International Arts Festival board and director on the Australian Centre for Contemporary Art board. She also spent time as a member of the boards of Monash University Museum of Art, the Melbourne International Arts Festival and the Australian Centre for Contemporary Art.

Her sacking caused anger among many parents, with a public meeting calling for the resignation of the board and the reinstatement of Storelli, and the event was covered widely on Australian media. Adler's last year on the board was 2015.

From 2010 to 2013, she served as deputy chair of the Book Industry Strategy Group and the Book Industry Collaborative Council.

In 2015, she was president of the Australian Publishers Association and was appointed to chair the Prime Minister's Literary Awards for fiction and poetry by Tony Abbott. 
 
 Adler is a Vice-Chancellor's Professorial Fellow at Monash University, a leadership role which includes the title of professor, a role that she will continue to fulfil, along with leading the publication of the  series of essays published by the university entitled In the National Interest.

Recognition and honours
In 2008 Adler was made a Member of the Order of Australia in the Australia Day Honours for "service to literature as a publisher, through support for and the promotion of emerging authors, to tertiary education, and to the community".

In 2015, she was awarded an honorary doctorate by Monash University, for "her services to Australian publishing, through to her support and promotion of emerging authors, education and the community".

Personal
She has been married to the actor and comedian Max Gillies since 1981, and they have two adult children.

References

External links

1954 births
Living people
Members of the Order of Australia
Australian people of French-Jewish descent
Australian Jews
Australian publishers (people)
20th-century publishers (people)
Meanjin people